John Wait McGauvran (c. 1827 – July 20, 1884) was a merchant and political figure in Quebec. He represented Montréal-Ouest in the Legislative Assembly of Quebec from 1873 to 1878 as a Conservative.

He was born in Glengarry County, Upper Canada, the son of Patrick McGauvran and Elizabeth Wait, and educated at Plantagenet. He owned several sawmills and also was a director of the National Insurance Company. McGauvran was a justice of the peace. He served as a member of Montreal city council from 1864 to 1877 and also served as president of the aqueduct commission from 1866 to 1877. He was first elected to the Quebec assembly in an 1873 by-election held after the death of Francis Cassidy. McGauran was defeated when he ran for reelection in 1878. He was buried in the Notre Dame des Neiges Cemetery.

References
 

Conservative Party of Quebec MNAs
1884 deaths
Year of birth uncertain
1827 births
Canadian justices of the peace
Anglophone Quebec people
Burials at Notre Dame des Neiges Cemetery